Pallokerho-35 (PK-35) Naiset is the representative women's football team of the Helsinki-based football club Pallokerho-35 (PK-35). The team debuted in Finland's top-level league, the Kansallinen Liiga, for the 2020 season. They gained promotion at the end of the previous season, winning the 2019 qualifier against IK Myran. PK-35 had previously reached the ascending qualifier in the 2018 season but lost to Oulu Nice Soccer (ONS).

PK-35's home ground is MagneCit Areena in the Pihlajamäki sub-district of Malmi, Helsinki. They also play home matches at the Pihlajamäen tekonurmi (Pihlajamäki astroturf), which has a capacity of 300 spectators.

History 
PK-35’s women’s football team was established in 1978, and the team played its first match at Pihlajamäki field on 12 June 1978. The team first participated in an organized league in 1982. PK-35 made it to the Naisten I-divisoona qualifiers in 1992 but did not qualify for promotion in that season. The third-tier Naisten I-divisoona was renamed Naisten Kakkonen in 1994 and PK-35 gained promotion to the renamed league for the 1999 season. PK-35 played in the Naisten Kakkonen until the end of the 2007 season when, under head coach Mitri Pakkasen, the team ascended to the second-tier Naisten Ykkönen.

At the end of the 2008 season, the PK-35 men’s and women’s representative teams were relocated to Vantaa, where they became the men’s and women’s representative teams of the newly-created club, PK-35 Vantaa. The transfer was done in the hope that the teams would have access to better resources in Vantaa. However, representative team activities carried on in Helsinki and the Helsinki-based PK-35 women’s team continued in the fourth-tier Naisten Kolmonen.

PK-35 earned promotion to the Naisten Ykkönen for the 2018 season after beating Malmin Palloseura and winning the club‘s seat. Rami Rantanen, who had previously coached the PK-35 junior-B girls team, took over as head coach of the women‘s representative team prior to the 2018 season. In 2018, PK-35 ranked second in the Naisten Ykkönen but lost the two-game qualifier against Oulu Nice Soccer and remained in the Ykkönen. In the following season, the team finally earned promotion to the Naisten Liiga after beating IK Myran in the qualifier. The first qualification match between PK-35 and IK Myran ended in a 2–2 tie. No goals were scored during regulation time of the second qualification match and the match dragged on to the penalty shootout. PK-35 eventually claimed a 4–2 victory after the penalty shootout.

Players and personnel 
Updated 30 May 2020

Current squad

Coaches and staff 

 Head Coach: Rami Rantanen
Assistant Coach: Krista Dahlberg
 Assistant Coach: Anne-Maria Weckström-Rantanen
 Goalkeeping Coach: Henrik Salmelainen
 Doctor, caretaker: Jan-Patrik Wiksten
 Team Manager: Karolina Hurmerinta

References 
Content in this article is translated from the existing Finnish Wikipedia article at :fi:Pallokerho-35 (naiset); see its history for attribution.

External links 

 Women's representative team on the PK-35 website (in Finnish)
Sports clubs in Helsinki
Women's football clubs in Finland